Luther Wallace Youngdahl (May 29, 1896 – June 21, 1978) was an American judge and politician who served as the 27th governor of Minnesota and a United States district judge of the United States District Court for the District of Columbia.

Education and career

Born on May 29, 1896, in Minneapolis, Minnesota, Youngdahl graduated from Minneapolis South High School. He then received a Bachelor of Arts degree in 1919 from Gustavus Adolphus College and a Bachelor of Laws in 1921 from the Minnesota College of Law (now Mitchell Hamline School of Law). He served as a Second Lieutenant in the United States Army during World War I. He was an assistant city attorney for Minneapolis from 1921 to 1924 and in private practice from 1924 to 1930. He was a judge of the Minneapolis Municipal Court from 1930 to 1936 and of the Minnesota District Court for the Fourth Judicial District from 1936 to 1942. He was an associate justice of the Minnesota Supreme Court from 1942 to 1946. A member of the Republican Party, he was the governor of Minnesota from January 8, 1947, to September 27, 1951.

Federal judicial service

On July 6, 1951, President Harry S. Truman nominated Youngdahl to a seat on the United States District Court for the District of Columbia vacated by Judge Thomas Alan Goldsborough. He was confirmed by the United States Senate on August 28, 1951, and received his commission on August 29, 1951. He assumed senior status on May 29, 1966. His service terminated on June 21, 1978, upon his death in Washington, D.C. He was interred in Arlington National Cemetery.

References

Further reading
 Esbjornson, Robert A Christian in Politics: Luther W. Youngdahl (1955)
 Luther W. Youngdahl papers

1896 births
1978 deaths
Politicians from Minneapolis
Military personnel from Minneapolis
American Lutherans
American people of Swedish descent
Republican Party governors of Minnesota
Judges of the United States District Court for the District of Columbia
Justices of the Minnesota Supreme Court
United States district court judges appointed by Harry S. Truman
20th-century American judges
Minnesota lawyers
Gustavus Adolphus College alumni
William Mitchell College of Law alumni
Burials at Arlington National Cemetery
Lawyers from Minneapolis
South High School (Minnesota) alumni